Oussama Abdeldjelil (born 23 June 1993) is an Algerian professional footballer who plays as a forward for French  side Sedan.

Club career
Abdeldjelil was born in Algeria, and moved to France at the age of 6. He began playing football with local clubs Belligny and FC Villefranche before moving to semi-professional teams in France and Algeria.

On 8 January 2019, Abdeldjelil signed a professional contract with Red Star F.C in the French Ligue 2, after beginning the season as the top scorer in the Championnat National with SO Cholet. He made his professional debut with Red Star in a 1–0 Ligue 2 win over RC Lens on 14 January 2019 scoring the only and game-winning goal.

In the summer of 2019, Abdeldjelil signed for neighbouring Ligue 2 club Paris FC after Red Star were relegated at the end of the 2018–19 Ligue 2 season. With no goals in 14 appearances, he left the club and returned to Cholet in January 2020.

In June 2020, Abdeldjelil was recruited by former US Orléans sporting director Anthar Yahia, to play for USM Alger in his country of birth.

On 31 January 2021, Abdeljelil signed for French Championnat National club US Boulogne on a contract until the end of the season, having terminated his contract with USM Alger. He was credited by some sources as scoring a hattrick in his first appearance for the club, in the clubs eighth-round Coupe de France game on 16 February 2021, although some sources at the time gave the third goal as an own goal.

International career
Abdeldjelil was born in Algeria, and represented the Algeria U23 for Olympic Games qualification.

References

External links
 
 

1993 births
People from Tlemcen Province
21st-century Algerian people
Living people
Association football forwards
Algerian footballers
Algeria under-23 international footballers
ÉFC Fréjus Saint-Raphaël players
Tarbes Pyrénées Football players
Lyon La Duchère players
JS Kabylie players
AS Saint-Priest players
DRB Tadjenanet players
SO Cholet players
Red Star F.C. players
Paris FC players
USM Alger players
US Boulogne players
SAS Épinal players
CS Sedan Ardennes players
Ligue 2 players
Championnat National players
Championnat National 2 players
Championnat National 3 players
Algerian Ligue Professionnelle 1 players
Algerian expatriate footballers
Algerian expatriate sportspeople in France
Expatriate footballers in France